In computer science, semantic knowledge management is a set of practices that seeks to classify content so that the knowledge it contains may be immediately accessed and transformed for delivery to the desired audience, in the required format. This classification of content is semantic in its nature – identifying content by its type or meaning within the content itself and via external, descriptive metadata – and is achieved by employing XML technologies.

The specific outcomes of these practices are:
 Maintain content for multiple audiences together in a single document 
 Transform content into various delivery formats without re-authoring
 Search for content more effectively 
 Involve more subject-matter experts in the creation of content without reducing quality 
 Reduce production costs for delivery formats 
 Reduce the manual administration of getting the right knowledge to the right people 
 Reduce the cost and time to localize content

Notable semantic knowledge management systems 
Learn eXact
Thinking Cap LCMS
Thinking Cap LMS
Xyleme LCMS
iMapping

References
 

Knowledge representation